Alexander Ogilvy Hardy DD (called Alec; 189114 September 1970) was an Anglican bishop in India from 1937 to 1948.

He was educated at Trinity College Dublin and ordained in 1917. His first post was a curacy at Templemore. After this he was a SPG Missionary at Hazaribagh then Murhu for 20 years before his appointment to the episcopate as the Bishop of Nagpur. Finally he was Vicar of Gargrave, an Assistant Bishop in the Diocese of Bradford and an honorary canon of Bradford Cathedral until his retirement in 1957.

References

1890 births
1970 deaths
Alumni of Trinity College Dublin
20th-century Anglican bishops in India
Anglican bishops of Nagpur